Xu Xianqing (1537–1602), courtesy name Gongwang, pseudonym Jian'an, was a Chinese statesman in the late Ming dynasty during the reigns of the Longqing and Wanli emperors.

Xianqing's literary work gained him much fame during his lifetime. His poems and essays are later collected and edited into the "Tianyuanlou Ji"().

Life
Native of Suzhou, Xu was born in a rich family of textile manufacturer. His mother died when he was 12. He passed the final stages of the imperial exams and received his jinshi degree in 1568 and worked in the Hanlin Academy for many years. In 1584, he was appointed chief of Guozijian, the highest national central institution of the Empire.

Xu was one of the main contributors of the final edition of the Collected Statutes of the Ming Dynasty.

In 1587, Xu was appointed as Vice-Minister of Rites and later became Vice-Minister of Personnel.

Painting folio
In 1588, Xu asked two painters to draw the important events of his life. The painting folio, named Xu Xianqing Huanji Tu (Painting folio of Xu Xianqing's working career) is now in the Collections of the Palace Museum of Beijing. The folio contains vivid materials reflecting the ritual paraphernalia of the Ming court.

Gallery

References

Politicians from Suzhou
Ming dynasty politicians
1537 births
1602 deaths